Vivian Ian Smith (23 February 1925 – 25 August 2015) was a South African cricketer who played in nine Test matches from 1947 to 1957 and was educated at Hilton College. He was born in Durban, Natal.

Smith was a right-arm leg-break bowler and lower-order right-handed batsman. He made his Test debut in England in 1947, playing four Tests in the series. He played three Tests against Australia in South Africa in 1949–50, one Test in England in 1955, and a final Test against Australia in South Africa in 1957–58. On his debut, against England at Nottingham in the First Test in 1947, he took 3 for 46 and 4 for 143. His eight subsequent Tests produced only five wickets. He played for Natal from 1945–46 to 1957–58. His best bowling figures were 9 for 88 (12 for 194 in the match) against Border in 1946–47. Smith died in 2015.

References

External links

1925 births
2015 deaths
KwaZulu-Natal cricketers
South African Universities cricketers
South Africa Test cricketers
South African cricketers
Alumni of Hilton College (South Africa)